Glitter is the 1972 debut album by British glam rock singer Gary Glitter, produced by Bell Records. Two tracks, "I Didn't Know I Loved You (Till I Saw You Rock and Roll)" and "Rock and Roll", the latter a song in two parts, achieved success as singles; each spent time amongst the top 40 singles in both the US and UK.

The album featured, in addition to including the two singles, other original songs that generated fan support, including "Rock On!", "Shakey Sue" and "The Famous Instigator", as well as Glitter's versions of "Baby, Please Don't Go" (written and first performed by American Big Joe Williams) and "The Wanderer" (first recorded by Dion DiMucci & the Del-Satins). The disc was a best-seller, reaching a high of # 8 in the UK charts.

The album was the first by Glitter to achieve international success and presaged his 1973 Touch Me. The album was also reissued in 1996 as a picture disc that was limited to 5,000 copies, which had a slightly differing track list than the album (included four added tracks: "I'm the Leader of the Gang (I Am)", "It's Not a Lot", "Just Fancy That" and "Thank You Baby for Myself").

2009 re-issue
The album was reissued in 2009 under Airmail Records including five bonus tracks: "I'm the Leader of the Gang (I Am)", "Just Fancy That", "I Love You Love Me Love", "Hands Up! It's a Stick-Up", and "Remember Me This Way".

Track listing
Side one
"Rock and Roll Part 1" (Gary Glitter, Mike Leander) 3:04
"Baby, Please Don't Go" (Big Joe Williams) 2.53
"The Wanderer" (Ernie Maresca) 2:44
"I Didn't Know I Loved You (Till I Saw You Rock and Roll)" (Glitter, Leander) 3:22
"Ain't That a Shame" (Glitter, Leander, Edward Seago) 2:39
"School Day (Ring! Ring! Goes The Bell)" (Chuck Berry) 3:07

Side two
"Rock On!" (Glitter, Leander) 3:32
"Donna" (Ritchie Valens) 4:18
"The Famous Instigator" (Glitter, Leander) 3:24
"The Clapping Song" (Lincoln Chase) 3:13
"Shaky Sue" (Glitter, Leander, Seago) 2:21
"Rock and Roll Part 2" (Glitter, Leander) 3:00

 Sides one and two were combined as tracks 1–12 on CD reissues.

1996 CD bonus tracks
"I'm the Leader of the Gang (I Am)" (Glitter, Leander)
"It's Not a Lot (But It's All I Got)" (Glitter, Leander)
"Just Fancy That" (Glitter, Leander)
"Thank You Baby for Myself"

2009 CD bonus tracks
"I'm the Leader of the Gang (I Am)" (Glitter, Leander)
"Just Fancy That" (Glitter, Leander)
"I Love You Love Me Love" (Glitter, Leander)
"Hands Up! It's a Stick-Up"
"Remember Me This Way" (Glitter, Leander)

Charts

Certifications

References

External links 
 

1972 debut albums
Gary Glitter albums
Bell Records albums
British rock-and-roll albums